The American garage rock band The Mooney Suzuki has released four studio albums, one live album, two extended plays (EPs) and eleven singles.

Studio albums

Live albums

Extended plays

Singles

Notes

1. Electric Sweat was re-released by Columbia on May 12, 2003.
2. The Mooney Suzuki was also known as The Black EP.
3. The Maximum Black EP is a re-release of The Mooney Suzuki with additional tracks.

References

Mooney Suzuki, The
Rock music group discographies